Eremolobulosa is a genus of drain flies in the subfamily Psychodinae.

Distribution
Northern Territory.

Species
Eremolobulosa tropicalis Duckhouse, 1990

References

Psychodidae
Nematocera genera
Diptera of Australasia